Plastered in Paris may refer to:

 Plastered in Paris (1966 film), a short film in The Inspector series
 Plastered in Paris (1928 film), an American comedy film